Bada Abbas Maldoum (born 1952) is a politician from Chad who served as Vice President of Chad from December 1990 to February 1991. He has also served as Minister of Justice from 1995 to 1996 and served as Interior minister of Chad in 1991.

References 

Living people
Vice presidents of Chad
Justice ministers of Chad
Date of birth missing (living people)
Place of birth missing (living people)
1952 births